English Rugby Union Midland Division - Midlands 6 West (North) is an English Rugby Union League.

Midlands 6 West (North) is made up of teams from around the East Midlands of England who play home and away matches throughout a winter season. As with many low level they are often subject to re-structure

Promoted teams move up to Midlands 5 West (North).

2008-2009 Teams

Aldridge
Essington  
Hanford  
Market Drayton
Rugeley  
Stone 
Wheaton Aston
Whittington

See also

 English rugby union system

7